Chenar Rural District is a rural district (dehestan) in Kabgian District, Dana County, Kohgiluyeh and Boyer-Ahmad Province, Iran. At the 2006 census, its population was 2,297, in 499 families. The rural district has 29 villages.

References 

Rural Districts of Kohgiluyeh and Boyer-Ahmad Province
Dana County